is a railway station on the West Japan Railway Company Hanwa Line in Sumiyoshi-ku, Osaka, Osaka Prefecture, Japan.

Layout
This station has two elevated side platforms serving a track each.  The northbound platform was elevated in 2004 and the southbound one in 2006.

History 

 March 2018 - Station numbering was introduced with Abikochō being assigned station number JR-R25.

References 

Railway stations in Osaka Prefecture
Railway stations in Japan opened in 1930